This is a list of Philippine presidents by tickets. The list contains the candidates for the offices of President of the Philippines and Vice President of the Philippines that their parties have nominated since 1935.

This list only includes the major parties and coalitions during the elections and their closest rivals during the elections. For full results and candidates, see the list of Philippine presidential elections.

From the Commonwealth period to the last election prior the declaration of martial law, the major parties always split their ticket: one candidate was from Luzon and another either from the Visayas or Mindanao (the so-called "North-South" ticket). In the post-martial law period, this has been less pronounced as most candidates have been from Luzon. Only the elections in 2010, 2016, and 2022 have had a "North-South" ticket.

List
This table includes presidential candidates who've either won 10% of the vote, or placed second, or whose vice presidential running mate won.

This doesn't include elections where only the presidency is on the ballot, nor candidates who had no running mates.

In 1935, there was no "administration ticket" as it was the first election, but the Nacionalista Party had control of the Philippine Legislature at this time, and was considered as the ruling party.

In 1992, there was no clear "administration ticket". Incumbent president Corazon Aquino endorsed the Lakas ticket of Fidel V. Ramos, but Congress was controlled by the LDP of Ramon Mitra, whom she originally endorsed. Both Lakas and LDP tickets are considered administration, while all other tickets were labeled as opposition tickets.

In 2022, the administration party, PDP–Laban, put up two presidential candidates in sequence, but both withdrew before ballots were printed.

Opposition tickets are ordered by number of votes for president.

Per election
This only includes the top two or three tickets of the election.

1935

1941

1946

1949

1953

1957

1961

1965

1969

1986

1992

1998

2004

2010

2016

2022

Maps
Only those include above are listed. The larger pog refers to the presidential candidate.

Commonwealth elections
 Green: Nacionalista Party
 Blue: Nationalist Socialist Party
 Red: Democratic Party
 Pink: Popular Front
 Yellow: Liberal Party

Third Republic elections
Green: Nacionalista Party
Yellow: Liberal Party
Purple: Progressive Party

Fourth Republic elections
Red: KBL
Bright yellow: UNIDO

Fifth Republic elections
If ticket contains members from different parties, the presidential nominee's color is used.
Cyan: Lakas
Orange: LAMMP/KNP/PMP
Blue: LDP
Light green: NPC
Bright yellow: PDP-Laban
Red: KBL
Pink: Aksyon
Bright pink: PRP
Turquoise: PROMDI
Green: Nacionalista
Yellow: Liberal

References

Presidential elections in the Philippines
Tickets